Ninth Doctor comic stories are those featuring the ninth incarnation of the Doctor from the television science fiction series Doctor Who. The Ninth Doctor's brief comic tenure included the involvement of Rose Tyler. No other Doctor had a run as  brief as the Ninth and none used exclusively his televised companion.

The Ninth Doctor's Doctor Who Magazine run was the only one ever completely drawn by a single penciller — Mike Collins — though other eras were nearly drawn by a single artist. The Ninth Doctor's run as the incumbent Doctor was just nine DWM issues long, plus a single story in an annual, making him by far the shortest-lived Doctor in comics. An ongoing comic book was launched by Titan in 2016.

Comics

Doctor Who Magazine

Titan Comics

Summer Events

Doctor Who Annuals

Short stories

Doctor Who Annuals

See also
 List of Doctor Who comic stories
 First Doctor comic stories
 Second Doctor comic stories
 Third Doctor comic stories
 Fourth Doctor comic strips
 Fifth Doctor comic stories
 Sixth Doctor comic stories
 Seventh Doctor comic stories
 Eighth Doctor comic stories
 War Doctor comic stories
 Tenth Doctor comic stories
 Eleventh Doctor comic stories
 Twelfth Doctor comic stories

Comics based on Doctor Who
Ninth Doctor stories